Lawn bowls at the 2005 Southeast Asian Games took place in the Hidden Vale Sports Club in Angeles City, Philippines.

The event was held from December 1–4.

Rules
Lawn bowls is a precision sport where the goal is to roll slightly radially asymmetrical balls (called bowls) closer to a smaller white ball (the "jack" or "kitty") than one's opponent is able to do. It is related to bocce and pétanque.

The game is usually played on a large, rectangular, precisely levelled and manicured grass or synthetic surface known as a bowling green, but an indoor variation on carpet is also played. In the simplest competition, singles, one of the two opponents begins a segment of the competition (in bowling parlance, an "end"), by placing the mat and rolling the jack to the other end of the green as a target. Once it has come to rest, the players take turns to roll their bowls from the mat towards the jack and thereby build up the "head". Bowls reaching the ditch are dead and removed from play, except in the event when one has "touched" the jack on its way. "Touchers" are marked with chalk and remain alive in play even though they are in the ditch. Similarly if the jack is knocked into the ditch it is still alive unless it is out of bounds to the side resulting in a "dead" end which is replayed. After each competitor has delivered all of their bowls (four each in singles), the distance of the closest bowls to the jack is determined (the jack may have been displaced) and points are awarded for each bowl which a competitor has closer than the opponent's nearest to the jack. For instance, if a competitor has bowled two bowls closer to the jack than their competitor's nearest, they are awarded two points. The exercise is then repeated for the next end.

Medal table

Medalists

Men

Women

External links
Southeast Asian Games Official Results

2005 Southeast Asian Games events
Lawn bowls in the Philippines